El Diablo también llora is a 1965 Spanish-Italian drama film directed by José Antonio Nieves Conde.

Cast
 Eleonora Rossi Drago as Ana Sandoval 
 Francisco Rabal as Tomás 
 Alberto Closas as Fernando Quiroga 
 Fernando Rey as Ramòn Quiroga 
 Paola Barbara as Ana's mother 
 Graziella Galvani as Marìa

External links
 

1965 films
Films directed by José Antonio Nieves Conde
Italian drama films
Spanish drama films
1960s Spanish-language films
Films scored by Riz Ortolani
1960s Italian films